Passiflora telesiphe is a species of flowering plant in the family Passifloraceae. It is endemic to Ecuador.

This is a vine with slender branches. The three-lobed leaves are up to 8 by 11 centimeters. The upper surface of the leaf is dark green, sometimes mottled with white, and the underside is purple. The flowers are solitary or paired with purple-tinged white petals. The filaments are white or purplish and are up to 2.6 centimeters long. The fruit has not been observed. This species is a member of the subgenus Decaloba.

This plant was first formally described in 1998, when it was discovered in Ecuador five years earlier during an observation of local butterflies by naturalists. A male telesiphe longwing (Heliconius telesiphe) was noted hovering about a plant, and the eggs and pupa of the species were found on it. The new plant was then named after the butterfly.

So far this plant is known only from Zamora-Chinchipe Province. It is found in low Andean forest habitat at elevations of 1700m.

References

telesiphe
Endemic flora of Ecuador
Data deficient plants
Plants described in 1998
Taxonomy articles created by Polbot